The year 2002 is the 2nd year in the history of World Extreme Cagefighting, a mixed martial arts promotion based in the United States. In 2002 WEC held 3 events beginning with, WEC 3: All or Nothing.

Events list

WEC 3: All or Nothing

WEC 3: All or Nothing was an event held on June 7, 2002 at the Tachi Palace in Lemoore, California, United States.

Results

WEC 4: Rumble Under the Sun

WEC 4: Rumble Under the Sun was an event held on August 31, 2002 at the Mohegan Sun Arena in Uncasville, Connecticut.

Results

WEC 5: Halloween Havoc

WEC 5: Halloween Havoc was an event held on October 18, 2002 at the Tachi Palace in Lemoore, California, United States.

Results

See also 
 World Extreme Cagefighting
 List of World Extreme Cagefighting champions
 List of WEC events

References

World Extreme Cagefighting events
2002 in mixed martial arts